Podklasztor  (English: "Under-monastery") is a former village in the administrative district of Gmina Krasnobród, within Zamość County, Lublin Voivodeship, in eastern Poland. It has been part of Krasnobród since 1995. There is a former Dominican monastery and Roman Catholic Shrine of Our Lady of Krasnobród (Sanktuarium Matki Bożej Krasnobrodzkiej).

References

External links
 Shrine of Our Lady of Krasnobród (in Polish)

Villages in Zamość County